Below is a list of the rosters for the 2018–19 WNBL season.

Rosters

Adelaide Lightning

Bendigo Spirit

Canberra Capitals

Dandenong Rangers

Melbourne Boomers

Perth Lynx

Sydney Uni Flames

Townsville Fire

Development players

References

rosters
Women's National Basketball League lists